Pana (Panah) is the district center of Giro District, Ghazni Province, Afghanistan. The roads towards it are in bad condition.

See also
 Ghazni Province

References

Populated places in Ghazni Province